Julie Soyer (born 30 June 1985) is a French footballer who plays as a defender for Division 1 Féminine club Paris FC.

Club career
She played for Évreux FC, CNFE Clairefontaine, FCF Hénin-Beaumont, Montpellier HSC and Paris Saint-Germain F.C. before joining FCF Juvisy.

International career
She was called up to be part of the national team for the UEFA Women's Euro 2013.

Career statistics

International

Notes

References

External links
 
 
 
 Profile at fussballtransfers.com 
 Profile at soccerdonna.de 
 Player stats at footofeminin.fr 
 
 

1985 births
Living people
French women's footballers
France women's youth international footballers
France women's international footballers
CNFE Clairefontaine players
Montpellier HSC (women) players
Paris Saint-Germain Féminine players
Paris FC (women) players
Sportspeople from Évreux
Women's association football defenders
Division 1 Féminine players
Footballers from Normandy
FCF Hénin-Beaumont players
21st-century French women

((https://instagram.com/juliesoyer_official?utm_medium=copy_link))